LG Corporation (or LG Group), known as LG and formerly Lucky-Goldstar from 1983 to 1995 (Korean: Leokki Geumseong), is a South Korean multinational conglomerate founded by Koo In-hwoi and managed by successive generations of his family. It is the fourth-largest chaebol in South Korea. Its headquarters are in the LG Twin Towers building in Yeouido-dong, Yeongdeungpo District, Seoul. LG makes electronics, chemicals, and telecommunications products and operates subsidiaries such as LG Electronics, Zenith, LG Display, LG Uplus,  LG Innotek, LG Chem, and LG Energy Solution in over 80 countries.

History 
LG Corporation was established as Lak Hui Chemical Industrial Corp. in 1947 by Koo In-hwoi. In 1952, Lak Hui (락희) (pronounced "Lucky"; now LG Chem) became the first South Korean company to enter the plastics industry. As the company expanded its plastics business, it established GoldStar Co. Ltd. (now LG Electronics Inc.) in 1958. Both companies Lucky and GoldStar merged to form Lucky-Goldstar in 1983.

GoldStar produced South Korea's first radio. Many consumer electronics were sold under the brand name GoldStar, while some other household products (not available outside South Korea) were sold under the brand name of Lucky. The Lucky brand was famous for hygiene products such as soaps and HiTi laundry detergents, but the brand was mostly associated with its Lucky and Perioe toothpaste. LG continues to manufacture some of these products for the South Korean market, such as laundry detergent.

Koo In-hwoi led the corporation until his death in 1969, at which time, his son Koo Cha-kyung took over. He then passed the leadership to his son, Koo Bon-moo, in 1995. Koo Bon-moo renamed the company to LG in that year.  The company also associates the letters LG with the company's tagline "Life's Good". Since 2009, LG has owned the domain name LG.com.

Koo Bon-moo died of a brain tumor on 20 May 2018. In July 2018, it was announced that Koo Kwang-mo, the nephew and adopted son of Koo Bon-moo, will be the new CEO of LG. Koo Bon-moo adopted his nephew in 2004, after losing his only son in 1994, citing "a family tradition of male-only succession".

Joint ventures 

LG and Hitachi created joint ventures named Hitachi-LG Data Storage in 2000 and LG Hitachi Water Solutions in 2011; among other partnerships it has had, LG has a long relationship with Hitachi dating back to the early years of Goldstar. Since then Hitachi has transferred technologies for LG's products such as radios, wires, TVs, home appliances, semiconductors, etc. The first JV between the two is LG Hitachi, which has been around since 1980s when it was established to import computers to Korea.

LG had two joint ventures with Royal Philips Electronics: LG Philips Display and LG Philips LCD, but Philips sold off its shares in late 2008.

In 2005, LG entered into a joint venture with Nortel Networks, creating LG-Nortel Co. Ltd.

In 2020, LG and Canadian auto supplier Magna International launched a joint venture known as LG Magna e-Powertrain. The new joint venture will manufacture components used in electric cars such as electric motors, inverters and onboard chargers.

International markets 
On 30 November 2012, comScore released a report of the October 2012 U.S. Mobile Subscriber Market Share that found LG lost its place as second in the U.S. mobile market share to Apple Inc.

On 20 January 2013, LG has overtaken Apple to become second largest in U.S. market share.

On 7 August 2013, comScore released a report of the June 2013 U.S. Smartphone Subscriber Market Share that found LG fell to fifth place in the U.S. mobile market share.

Associated companies 
 GS Group
 LS Group
 LIG Group
 Heesung Group
 SPC Group

Structure and financial position 
LG Corporation is a holding company that operates worldwide through more than 30 companies in the electronics, chemical, and telecom fields. Its electronics subsidiaries manufacture and sell products ranging from electronic and digital home appliances to televisions and mobile telephones, from Thin-film-transistor liquid-crystal displays to security devices and semiconductors. In the chemical industry, subsidiaries manufacture and sell products including cosmetics, industrial textiles, rechargeable batteries and toner products, polycarbonates, medicines, and surface decorative materials. Its telecom products include long-distance and international phone services, mobile and broadband telecommunications services, as well as consulting and telemarketing services. LG also operates the Coca-Cola Korea Bottling Company, manages real estate, offers management consulting, and operates professional sports clubs.

Group families

Electronics industries 

 LG Electronics
 LG Appliances
 LG Display
 LG Innotek
 ZKW Group

Chemical industries 

 LG Chem
 LG Energy Solution
 SEETEC
 LG Household & Health Care
 Ĭsa Knox
 Haitai HTB
 The Face Shop
 Beyond
 CNP
 CARE ZONE
 VONIN
 Coca-Cola Beverage Company (South Korea)
 LG Lever Korea

Telecommunications 

 LG U+
 CS Leader
 CS ONE Partner
 LG CNS
 V-ENS
 BIZTECH & EKTIMO
 Ucess Partners
 Monkey House
 Pixdix
 G2R
 HS Ad
 Twenty Twenty

 Source

Sports sponsorship 
LG  owns the South Korean professional baseball team LG Twins, and is the main sponsor of basketball team Changwon LG Sakers. LG is also a partner of the American professional baseball team Texas Rangers.

Brand ambassadors 
 David Warner (2014)

References 

 
1947 establishments in Korea
Chaebol
Companies based in Seoul
Companies listed on the Korea Exchange
Conglomerate companies established in 1947
Conglomerate companies of South Korea
Electronics companies established in 1947
Electronics companies of South Korea
Holding companies established in 1947
Holding companies of South Korea
Multinational companies headquartered in South Korea
Telecommunications companies of South Korea
Pump manufacturers
Electric motor manufacturers
Mobile phone manufacturers